Sakurai Shrine (桜井神社, Sakurai jinja, also 櫻井神社) is a Shinto shrine located in Sakai, Osaka Prefecture, Japan. It was founded at an unknown date and holds its annual festival on the first Sunday in October. It enshrines Emperor Ōjin, Emperor Chūai, and Empress Jingū as kami. The oratory (拝殿, haiden) is designated as the only Japanese National Treasure in Sakai City.

See also
List of Shinto shrines in Japan

External links
Sightseeing website

Shinto shrines in Osaka Prefecture